Mannargudi taluk is a taluk in Thiruvarur district of the Indian state of Tamil Nadu. The headquarters of the taluk is the town of Mannargudi.

Demographics
According to the 2011 census, the taluk of Mannargudi had a population of 308,059 with 152,132  males and 155,927 females. There were 1025 women for every 1000 men. The taluk had a literacy rate of 75.15. Child population in the age group below 6 was 13,403 Males and 12,729 Females.

References

Taluks of Tiruvarur district